Dendrophthoe glabrescens, commonly known as orange mistletoe, is a hemiparasitic plant of the mistletoe family Loranthaceae, found in eastern and northern Australia. It flowers from October to January. The flowers are tubular, with a green base, but where the tube splits open, it displays orange and bright red.

Taxonomy
It was first described in 1925 as Loranthus vitellinus var. glabrescens by William Blakely,<ref name=apni>{{APNI2|id=87073|name=Dendrophthoe glabrescens}}</ref> and in 1962 was transferred to the genus, Dendrophthoe'', and raised to species status by Bryan Barlow.

References

glabrescens
Flora of Western Australia
Flora of New South Wales
Flora of Queensland
Parasitic plants
Plants described in 1925
Taxa named by William Blakely